Dame Mary Jean Gilmore  (née Cameron; 16 August 18653 December 1962) was an Australian writer and journalist known for her prolific contributions to Australian literature and the broader national discourse. She wrote both prose and poetry.

Gilmore was born in rural New South Wales, and spent her childhood in and around the Riverina, living both in small bush settlements and in larger country towns like Wagga Wagga. Gilmore qualified as a schoolteacher at the age of 16, and after a period in the country was posted to Sydney. She involved herself with the burgeoning labour movement, and she also became a devotee of the utopian socialism views of William Lane. In 1893, Gilmore and 200 others followed Lane to Paraguay, where they formed the New Australia Colony. She started a family there, but the colony did not live up to expectations and they returned to Australia in 1902.

Drawing on her connections in Sydney, Gilmore found work with The Australian Worker as the editor of its women's section, a position she held from 1908 to 1931. She also wrote for a variety of other publications, including The Bulletin and The Sydney Morning Herald, becoming known as a campaigner for the welfare of the disadvantaged. Gilmore's first volume of poetry was brought out in 1910; she published prolifically for the rest of her life, mainly poetry but also memoirs and collections of essays. She wrote on a variety of themes, although the public imagination was particularly captured by her evocative views of country life. Her best known work is "No Foe Shall Gather Our Harvest", which served as a morale booster during World War II.

Gilmore's greatest recognition came in later life. She was the doyenne of the Sydney literary world, and became something of a national icon, making frequent appearances in the new media of radio and television. Gilmore maintained her prodigious output into old age, publishing her last book of verse in 1954, aged 89. Two years earlier she had begun writing a new column for the Tribune (the official newspaper of the Communist Party), which she continued for almost a decade. Gilmore died at the age of 97 and was accorded a state funeral, a rare honour for a writer. She has featured on the reverse of the Australian ten-dollar note since 1993.

Early life

Mary Jean Cameron was born on 16 August 1865 at the small settlement of Cotta Walla (modern-day Roslyn), just outside Crookwell, New South Wales. When she was one year old her parents, Donald Cameron, a farmer from Scotland, and Mary Ann Beattie, decided to move to Wagga Wagga to join her maternal grandparents, the Beatties, who had moved there from Penrith, New South Wales in 1866.

Her father obtained a job as a station manager at a property at Cowabbie, 100 km north of Wagga. A year later, he left that job to become a carpenter, building homesteads on properties in Wagga, Coolamon, Junee, Temora and West Wyalong for the next 10 years. This itinerant existence allowed Mary only a spasmodic formal education; however, she did receive some on their frequent returns to Wagga, either staying with the Beatties or in rented houses.

Her father purchased land and built his own house at Brucedale on the Junee Road, where they had a permanent home. She was then to attend, albeit briefly, Colin Pentland's private Academy at North Wagga Wagga and, when the school closed, transferred to Wagga Wagga Public School for two and a half years. At 14, in preparation to become a teacher, she worked as an assistant at her uncle's school at Yerong Creek. Another uncle, Charles White (1845–1922), was a journalist and author of books on bushrangers.

After completing her teaching exams in 1882, she accepted a position as a teacher at Wagga Wagga Public School, where she worked until December 1885. After a short teaching spell at Illabo she took up a teaching position at Silverton near the mining town of Broken Hill. There Gilmore developed her socialist views and began writing poetry.

Literary career

In 1890, she moved to Sydney, where she became part of the "Bulletin school" of radical writers. Although the greatest influence on her work was Henry Lawson it was Alfred "A. G." Stephens, literary editor of The Bulletin, who published her verse and established her reputation as a fiery radical poet, champion of the workers and the oppressed.

She had a relationship with Henry Lawson that probably began in 1890. She writes of an unofficial engagement and Lawson's wish to marry her, but it was broken by his frequent absences from Sydney. The story of the relationship is told in the play "All My Love", written by Anne Brooksbank.

She followed William Lane and other socialist idealists to Paraguay in 1896, where they had established a communal settlement called New Australia two years earlier. At Lane's breakaway settlement Cosme she married William Gilmore in 1897. By 1900 the socialist experiment had clearly failed. Will left to work as a shearer in Argentina and Mary and her two-year-old son Billy soon followed, living separately in Buenos Aires for about six months, and then the family moved to Patagonia until they saved enough for a return passage, via England, in 1902 to Australia, where they took up farming near Casterton, Victoria.

Gilmore's first volume of poetry was published in 1910, and for the ensuing half-century she was regarded as one of Australia's most popular and widely read poets. In 1908 she became women's editor of The Worker, the newspaper of then Australia's largest and most powerful trade union, the Australian Workers' Union (AWU). She was the union's first woman member. The Worker gave her a platform for her journalism, in which she campaigned for the preservation of the White Australia Policy, better working conditions for working women, for children's welfare and for a better deal for the indigenous Australians.

Later life

By 1931, Gilmore's views had become too radical for the AWU, but she soon found other outlets for her writing. She later wrote a regular column for the Communist Party's newspaper Tribune, although she was never a party member herself. In spite of her somewhat controversial politics, Gilmore accepted appointment as a Dame Commander of the Order of the British Empire in 1937, becoming Dame Mary Gilmore. She was the first person to be granted the award for services to literature. During World War II, she wrote stirring patriotic verse such as No Foe Shall Gather Our Harvest.

In her later years, Gilmore, separated from her husband, moved to Sydney, and enjoyed her growing status as a national literary icon. Before 1940, she published six volumes of verse and three editions of prose. After the war, Gilmore published volumes of memoirs and reminiscences of colonial Australia and the literary giants of 1890s Sydney, thus contributing much material to the mythologising of that period. Dame Mary Gilmore died in 1962, aged 97, and was accorded the first state funeral for a writer since the death of Henry Lawson in 1922.

Recognition and legacy
Dobell's 1957 portrait of Dame Mary Gilmore was a finalist in that year's Archibald Prize, and can be seen in the Art Gallery of NSW.
 
In 1973 she was honoured on a postage stamp issued by Australia Post.

A park in West Pennant Hills, Sydney is named in her honour. The park hosts a large flag pole and Australian flag with the location historically being the location of a signal flag for communication between the early settlements of Parramatta and Windsor.

The Canberra suburb of Gilmore, the state highway, Mary Gilmore Way, a federal electorate, the Division of Gilmore and Gilmore Crescent in the Canberra suburb of Garran are named in her honour.

Gilmore's image appears on the third series Australian $10 note (since 2017), along with an illustration inspired by "No Foe Shall Gather Our Harvest" and, as part of the copy-protection microprint, the text of the poem itself. The background of the illustration features a portrait of Gilmore by the well-known Australian artist Sir William Dobell.

She was the great-great aunt of politician and later prime minister Scott Morrison, who in 2012, on the 50th anniversary of her death, delivered a tribute to her in federal parliament.

In September 2019, Gilmore's poem, "No Foe Shall Gather Our Harvest" was read aloud by United States president Donald Trump during a state dinner for Australia in the presence of prime minister Morrison.

Mary Gilmore Award
The Mary Gilmore Award was established in 1956 by the Australian Council of Trade Unions (ACTU) as the ACTU Dame Mary Gilmore Award, and after several incarnations with prizes awarded in several different categories, has been awarded as a poetry prize since 1985,  by the Association for the Study of Australian Literature.

Bibliography

Poetry
 Two Songs (1905)
 Marri'd and Other Verses (1910)
 The Tale inks (1916) 
 Six Songs from the South (1916)
 The Passionate Heart (1918)
 The Hound of the Road (1922)
 The Tilted Cart : A Book of Recitations (1925)
 The Wild Swan : Poems (1930)
 The Rue Tree : Poems (1931)
 Under the Wilgas (1932)
 Battlefields (1939)
 Pro Patria and Other Poems (1944)
 Selected Verse (1948)
 Fourteen Men : Verses (1954)
 Men of Eureka and Other Australian Songs (1954)
 Verse for Children (1955)
 Poems (1957)
 Mary Gilmore edited by Robert D. Fitzgerald (1963)
 Poems to Read to Young Australians (1968)
 The Singing Tree : A Selection of Mary Gilmore's Poetry for Young Readers (1971)
 The Collected Verse of Mary Gilmore edited by Jennifer Strauss (2004–07)

Individual poems
 "No Foe Shall Gather Our Harvest" (1940)

Prose
 Old Days : Old Ways : A Book of Recollections (1934)
 More Recollections (1935)
 Letters of Mary Gilmore edited by W. H. Wilde and T. Inglis Moore (1980)

Notes

References
 
 
 Whitehead, Anne (2003) Bluestocking in Patagonia: Mary Gilmore's Quest for Love and Utopia at the World's End, Allen & Unwin.

Further reading
 Dymphna Cusack and others, Mary Gilmore: A Tribute (1965)
 
 Gavin Souter, A Peculiar People – The Australians in Paraguay
 W.H.Wilde, Courage a Grace – Melbourne University Press (1988)
 W H Wilde and T Inglis Moore, Letters of Mary Gilmore (1980)

1865 births
1962 deaths
Australian activists
Australian journalists
Australian people of Scottish descent
Australian women poets
20th-century Australian poets
Australian Presbyterians
Australian Dames Commander of the Order of the British Empire
Writers from Sydney
People from Wagga Wagga
Australian socialists
ALS Gold Medal winners
Paraguayan people of Australian descent
19th-century Australian women
20th-century Australian women